Rosický is a Czech surname that may refer to
Evžen Rošický (1914–1942), Czech athlete and journalist
Jaroslav Rošický (1884–1942), Czech army officer
Jiří Rosický (disambiguation)
Tomáš Rosický (born 1980), Czech football player

See also
Neighbour Rosicky, a short story by Willa Cather

Czech-language surnames